The John J. Aiken House (also known as the Aiken-Silvernail House) is a historic house located at 6805 Poverty Hill Road in Ellicottville, Cattaraugus County, New York.

Description and history 
It was built in about 1837, and is a two-story, "L"-plan, heavy timber-framed dwelling with modest Greek Revival style detailing. It is set on a stone foundation, has a front gable roof, and is sheathed in narrow clapboard sheathing. It was built by Rev John J. Aiken, Presbyterian minister and agent with the American Bible Society.
It was listed on the National Register of Historic Places on February 20, 2013.
Sadly, this glorious structure has been confirmed to have been torn down within the last couple of years.

References

Houses on the National Register of Historic Places in New York (state)
Houses completed in 1837
Buildings and structures in Cattaraugus County, New York
National Register of Historic Places in Cattaraugus County, New York
Greek Revival houses in New York (state)